Proudfoot is a surname, and may refer to:

 Bill Proudfoot (1868–1931), Australian rules footballer
 Ben Proudfoot, Canadian filmmaker
 David Proudfoot (trade unionist) (1892–1958), Scottish trades unionist and communist
James Proudfoot (1908–1971), Scottish-born British portrait and landscape painter.
 Jim Proudfoot (born 1972), English football commentator
 Jim Proudfoot (journalist) (1933–2001), Canadian sports journalist
 Jimmy Proudfoot (1906–1963), English footballer
 John Proudfoot (disambiguation), multiple people
 Kimo Proudfoot, American director of music videos
 Peter Proudfoot (1879–1941), a Scottish footballer
 Tony Proudfoot (1949–2010), Canadian football defensive back
 Wilfred Proudfoot (1921–2013), British Conservative Party politician and businessman
 Willis T. Proudfoot (1860–1928), also known as William T. Proudfoot, American architect
 William Proudfoot (1859–1922), Ontario politician and barrister

See also
 Proudfoot Supermarkets in the Scarborough, North Yorkshire district.

English-language surnames
Surnames of English origin
Surnames of British Isles origin
Occupational surnames